"My Song for You" (also known as "Song for You" or "Sing My Song for You") is a song by American recording artists Demi Lovato and Joe Jonas. It was composed by Kari Kimmel and Scott Krippayne. The song was not included on an album. On November 28, 2010, Lovato and Jonas performed the song on TV series Sonny with a Chance in the episode "A So Random! Holiday Special".

Bridgit Mendler and Shane Harper version

"My Song for You" is a song by American recording artists Bridgit Mendler and Shane Harper from the Christmas compilation Disney Channel Holiday Playlist in 2012. It was composed by Kari Kimmel and Scott Krippayne. The song peaked at number three on Billboard Holiday Songs.

Critical reception
James Christopher Monger to AllMusic was positive and said the song have a youthful enthusiasm, but haven't "syrupy strings, gentle pianos, or heavenly choirs", typical of Christmas songs. Karin Elwood to Girls' Life magazine said that "My Song for You" it's the best song on the album and can melt any heart and put feelings. Disney Dreaming said it's cute to hear Mendler and Harper singing together and they loved the song.

Live performances
On December 2, 2012, Mendler and Harper performed the song on TV series Good Luck Charlie, in the episode A Duncan Christmas. The performance reached the second highest ratings of the season.

Chart performance

References

2012 songs
Bridgit Mendler songs
Hollywood Records singles
American Christmas songs
Demi Lovato songs
Joe Jonas songs
Songs written by Kari Kimmel
Songs written by Scott Krippayne